Western Fields is a historic home located at Hebron, Wicomico County, Maryland, United States. It is a Greek Revival-style three-part frame "telescope" dwelling started about 1790 and expanded in the mid-19th century. The main block was constructed in 1845. The property also includes an early-20th century frame tenant house and corn crib, and a small family cemetery. In 1997, the Maple Leaf Farm Potato House was moved to Western Fields. Since 1825, the property was owned by the Phillips family, prominent Wicomico County planters during the 19th and 20th centuries.

Western Fields was listed on the National Register of Historic Places in 1987.

References

External links
, including photo from 1986, at Maryland Historical Trust

Houses on the National Register of Historic Places in Maryland
Houses in Wicomico County, Maryland
Houses completed in 1790
Greek Revival houses in Maryland
National Register of Historic Places in Wicomico County, Maryland